

Werner Ziegler (30 April 1916 – 15 April 2001) was a German officer during World War II. He was also a recipient of the Knight's Cross of the Iron Cross with Oak Leaves and Swords of Nazi Germany.

Ziegler joined the Bundeswehr in 1956, serving at the Infantry School in Hammelburg under General Hellmuth Mäder. In 1960 Ziegler served deputy commander of the Panzergrenadierbrigade 35. Seven years later he retired as Oberst and commander of the Panzergrenadierbrigade 19 in Ahlen.

Awards 
 Wound Badge in Black
 Infantry Assault Badge in Bronze
 Close Combat Clasp in Bronze
 Tank Destruction Badge for Individual Combatants
 Crimea Shield
 Iron Cross (1939) 2nd Class (7 July 1940) & 1st Class (26 April 1941)
 Knight's Cross of the Iron Cross with Oak Leaves and Swords
 Knight's Cross on 31 December 1941 as Leutnant and leader of the 2./Infanterie-Regiment 186
 121st Oak Leaves on 8 September 1942 as Oberleutnant and leader of the 2./Infanterie-Regiment 186
 102nd Swords on 23 October 1944 as Major and leader of Infanterie-Regiment 186

References

Citations

Bibliography 

 
 
 

1916 births
2001 deaths
Recipients of the Knight's Cross of the Iron Cross with Oak Leaves and Swords
German Army officers of World War II
German military personnel of the Bundeswehr
Military personnel from Baden-Württemberg
People from Ortenaukreis